Urvashi Vaid (8 October 1958 – 14 May 2022) was an Indian-born American LGBT rights activist, lawyer, and writer. An expert in gender and sexuality law, she was a consultant in attaining specific goals of social justice. She held a series of roles at the National LGBTQ Task Force. She is the author of Virtual Equality: The Mainstreaming of Gay and Lesbian Liberation (1995) and Irresistible Revolution: Confronting Race, Class and the Assumptions of LGBT Politics (2012).

Early life
Urvashi Vaid was born on 8 October 1958, in New Delhi, India and moved to Potsdam, New York, at age eight with her family, after her father, writer Krishna Baldev Vaid, took up a university teaching position.  At age 11, she participated in the anti-Vietnam war movement. At Vassar College, she was active in a variety of political and social causes. She received a Juris Doctor degree from Northeastern University School of Law in Boston in 1983, where she founded the Boston Lesbian/Gay Political Alliance, a non-partisan political organization that interviews and endorses candidates for political office and advocates for Boston's gay community.

Career
Vaid was president of the Vaid Group LLC, which works with social justice innovators, movements, and organizations to address structural inequalities based on sexual orientation, gender identity, race, gender, and economic status.

She was the Director of the Engaging Tradition Project at the Center for Gender and Sexuality Law at Columbia Law School from 2011 to 2015. The project focused on the way tradition is used in movements for gender and sexuality to inform, enable or limit the movement. Vaid spent ten years working in global philanthropic organizations, serving as Executive Director of the Arcus Foundation (2005–2010) and Deputy Director of Governance and Civil Society Unit of the Ford Foundation (2001–2005) as well as serving on the board of the Gill Foundation (2004–2014).

Vaid was the founder of LPAC, the first lesbian Super PAC, which was launched in July 2012 and  has invested millions of dollars in candidates who are committed to legislation promoting social justice. She was founder of The Vaid Group, a social innovation consultancy that advises individuals and organizations working to advance equity, justice and inclusion globally and domestically.

For more than ten years, Vaid worked in various capacities at the National LGBTQ Task Force (NGLTF), the oldest national LGBT civil rights organization; first as its media director, then as executive director (1989–1992), and as director of its Policy Institute think-tank. While executive director, Vaid disrupted a presidential press conference being made by George H. W. Bush with a sign "Talk Is Cheap, AIDS Funding Is Not"; she also co-founded the Task Force's Creating Change conference. From 1983 to 1986, Vaid was staff attorney at the National Prison Project of the American Civil Liberties Union (ACLU), where she initiated the organization's work on HIV/AIDS in prisons.

Political activism 

Vaid believed that lesbian, gay, bisexual, and transgender (LGBT) equality will occur only when the larger institutions of society and the family are transformed to be more inclusive of racial, gender, and economic difference. Her book Virtual Equality: The Mainstreaming of Gay and Lesbian Liberation (1995) won a Stonewall Book Award in 1996.

Vaid became Executive Director of the National Gay and Lesbian Task Force (NGLTF) in 1989. Vaid left NGLTF in December 1992 and wrote Virtual Equality (published in 1995). She returned to NGLTF from 1997 to 2001 as the director of its think tank, the NGLTF Policy Institute. 
Vaid worked for five years at the Ford Foundation, and served as Executive Director of the Arcus Foundation. She served on the board of the Gill Foundation from 2004 to 2014.

In April 2009 Out magazine named her one of the 50 most influential LGBT people in the United States.

Vaid's book Irresistible Revolution: Confronting Race, Class and the Assumptions of LGBT Politics (2012) critiques the racial and gender bias of the mainstream LGBT movement and continues her argument that engagement with social justice is what will enable all parts of the LGBT community to realize equality and justice. Vaid told Curve magazine that her biggest fear was that LGBT communities would get preoccupied by the wins in the fight for marriage equality and slow down their movement. She argued for a more inclusive movement, one that would encompass everyone regardless of race, class, ethnicity, age, or ability.

Vaid hoped that the future of LGBT communities will accomplish two things. "One is to take care of the parts of our community that are less powerful. That means low-income LGBT people, transgender people and our community's women, whose rights are getting the crap kicked out of them, parts of our community across the board—kids, old gay people" and "The second thing I would love to see happen is for the LGBT community to use its political power and access to create a more just society for all."

Personal life 

Vaid shared homes in Manhattan and Provincetown, Massachusetts, with her partner, comedian Kate Clinton. She died at home from cancer on 14 May 2022. Vaid was an aunt of Alok Vaid-Menon, a gender non-conforming writer, performance artist, and media personality.

Awards
 1996: Stonewall Book Awards
 1996: Lambda Legal Lambda Liberty Award
 1997: Asian American Legal Defense & Education Fund Civil Rights Leadership Award
1999: City University of New York, Queens College of Law Honorary Degree
2002: American Foundation for AIDS Research Honoring With Pride Award
2006: National Lesbian and Gay Law Association, Dan Bradley Award
2008: Gay Men's Health Crisis Lifetime Achievement Award
2010: Services and Advocacy for LGBT Elders Ken Dawson Advocacy Award
2010: CLAGS: The Center for LGBTQ Studies Kessler Award for LGBTQ Studies 
2013: American Library Association Over The Rainbow project award for Irresistible Revolution
2014: 33rd Winter Roundtable, Columbia Teachers College, Columbia University Social Justice Action Award
 2014: GLAD Spirit of Justice Award
 2015: Honorary Degree Kalamazoo College

Works 
 
 
 
 Vaid, Urvashi. (2012) Irresistible Revolution: Confronting Race, Class and the Assumptions of LGBT Politics. Magnus Books.

In popular culture
Her name appears in the lyrics of the Le Tigre song "Hot Topic".

References

Further reading

External links

1958 births
2022 deaths
American people of Indian descent
American people of Punjabi descent
American women writers of Indian descent
Indian emigrants to the United States
American lesbian writers
American LGBT rights activists
Northeastern University School of Law alumni
People from New Delhi
Vassar College alumni
American LGBT people of Asian descent
Stonewall Book Award winners
21st-century American women writers
Deaths from cancer in New York (state)
Articles containing video clips